SFRA may refer to:

 Science Fiction Research Association
 Special Flight Rules Area, a type of U.S. aviation airspace with special restrictions 
 Strategic Flood Risk Assessment
 Sweep frequency response analysis